Burleigh is a suburban area in  Minchinhampton, Gloucestershire, England, in Stroud local government district.

Notes and references

 Burleigh, Stroud, Ordnance Survey
 British Place Names

Populated places in Gloucestershire
Stroud District